Guisa Municipal Museum is a museum located in Guisa, Cuba. It was established as a museum on 27 November 1985.

The museum holds sections on history and weaponry.

See also 
 List of museums in Cuba

References 

Museums in Cuba
Buildings and structures in Granma Province
Museums established in 1985
1985 establishments in Cuba
20th-century architecture in Cuba